Charles Sumner Post #25, Grand Army of the Republic is a historic fraternal lodge building located in Chestertown, Kent County, Maryland. Named after Charles Sumner, it was constructed as a meeting hall about 1908 and is a two-story gable-front frame building, built on brick piers, with a rectangular floor plan.  It is located in the Scotts Point area, a historically black area within the Chestertown Historic District, and was abandoned between 1985 and 2002.  It is one of only two Grand Army of the Republic halls for African-American veterans known to survive in the Nation.

It was listed on the National Register of Historic Places in 2005. In 2012, Preservation Maryland placed the Charles Sumner Post #25 on its list of threatened historic properties.

The building has been restored by the Kent County Arts Council and opened to the public in 2014 as a museum of American Civil War history and the role of African-Americans in the war.

References

External links
 Charles Sumner Post #25 - Kent County Arts Council
, includes photo from 1986, at Maryland Historical Trust

Clubhouses on the National Register of Historic Places in Maryland
Buildings and structures completed in 1908
Buildings and structures in Kent County, Maryland
Museums in Kent County, Maryland
American Civil War museums in Maryland
African-American history of Maryland
National Register of Historic Places in Kent County, Maryland
1908 establishments in Maryland